Meshawn Maddock is an American politician in the Republican Party serving as co-chair of the Michigan Republican Party along with Chair Ronald Weiser. Previously, she was Chair of the 11th Congressional District for the Michigan Republican Party. She is married to Republican Michigan State Representative Matt Maddock.

Maddock is a strong supporter of President Donald Trump and was a prior board member of Women for Trump, as well as being involved in several pro-Trump organizations such as the Michigan Conservative Coalition. The New York Times said that events around her election "signaled a profound shift in Republican politics." Prior to being elected, she was a businesswoman in Oakland County. Maddock supports Trump's false claims of election fraud in the 2020 presidential election. In January 2021, Maddock helped organize a delegation of 19 buses to travel to Washington to protest the election results. She spoke at the “Stop the Steal” rally on January 5. Maddock said she was absent from the storming of the Capitol that occurred the next day.

Maddock, along with 15 others, submitted certificates to the federal government claiming they were Michigan's presidential electors for the 2020 presidential election. They were not. Michigan Attorney General Dana Nessel said they likely violated state laws regarding forgery of a public record and election forgery. The fake electors were referred to the U.S. Attorney for possible prosecution. The Michigan GOP chair later testified before the House committee on the January 6 attack that Maddock and the others planned to hide out in the state Capitol building so they could cast their fake elector ballots on the specified day. That plan did not come to fruition.

In June 2021, Maddock called for Michigan to secede from the United States, saying the secession is "to escape Michigan Democratic Gov. Gretchen Whitmer's tyrannical rule."

Maddock promoted an unsubstantiated rumor on social media in 2022 that Midland Public Schools had placed litter boxes in the bathrooms for students who identified as cats or furries. The school superintendent denied the rumor in a statement issued to parents, and the fact-checking organization Snopes found no evidence for it.

Maddock has been criticized for the language in her social media attacks. A tweet describing Transportation Secretary Pete Buttigieg as a "weak little girl" was criticized as sounding homophobic. A tweet describing a Black Michigan elected official as a "scary masked man" was criticized as sounding racist.

References

Living people
Year of birth missing (living people)
Place of birth missing (living people)
Michigan Republicans
Women in Michigan politics
People from Oakland County, Michigan
21st-century American women

Far-right politicians in the United States